Bucculatrix mellita is a moth in the family Bucculatricidae. It was described by Edward Meyrick in 1915. It is found in Peru.

References

Bucculatricidae
Moths described in 1915
Taxa named by Edward Meyrick
Moths of South America